Shurak-e Saburi (also Romanized as Shūrak-e Sabūrī; also known as Shūrak-e Afghānhā) is a village in Abravan Rural District, Razaviyeh District, Mashhad County, Razavi Khorasan Province, Iran. At the 2006 census, its population was 649, in 123 families.

References 

Populated places in Mashhad County